3-Ethylpentane (C7H16) is a branched saturated hydrocarbon.  It is an alkane, and one of the many structural isomers of heptane, consisting of a five carbon chain with a two carbon branch at the middle carbon.

An example of an alcohol derived from 3-ethylpentane is the tertiary alcohol 3-ethylpentan-3-ol.

References

Alkanes

it has 5 different skeletal structural isomers